Deen Dayal Mobile Health Clinic is a program in Madhya Pradesh, India that uses mobile health clinics to provide medical care to rural and disadvantaged populations. 

Each van is GPS-enabled and is staffed with a doctor, nurse, lab attendant and pharmacist. The vans, or Mobile Medical Units (MMUs), were operational in 1998 under the name Jeewan Jyoti Yojana, although the program relaunched in 2006 under its current name.

References

Government schemes in Madhya Pradesh
Health programmes in India
Memorials to Deendayal Upadhyay